The 1975–76 season was Manchester City's 74th season of competitive football and 56th season in the top division of English football. In addition to the First Division, the club competed in the FA Cup, Football League Cup and the Anglo-Scottish Cup.

First Division

League table

Results summary

References

External links

Manchester City F.C. seasons
Manchester City